Karen Louise Stupples (born 24 June 1973) is an English former professional golfer who played primarily on the U.S.-based LPGA Tour and was also a member of the Ladies European Tour.

Amateur career
Stupples was born in Dover, Kent. She started her golfing career as a caddie for her father at Prince's Golf Club, Sandwich to earn pocket money.  She played for England Juniors from 1989–1991 and England Seniors from 1995-1998.  She also represented Great Britain & Ireland on the Curtis Cup winning team in 1996 at home in Killarney, Ireland and losing 1998 team away in Minneapolis, Minnesota.

Stupples was going to study polymer science in the UK before deciding to go to university in the United States. With the assistance of College Prospects of America, she took a golf scholarship at Arkansas State University before transferring to Florida State University in 1993. As a Seminole, she won two events (Spring 1994 Spalding/Peggy Kirk Bell and Spring 1995 Lady Gator), was selected as All-Atlantic Coast Conference in 1994 and 1995, and was also named a 1995 Second-Team All-American.

Stupples turned professional following the 1998 U.S. Women's Amateur.

Professional career
Despite being a professional, Stupples returned home to England becoming a cloakroom attendant for the Port of Dover and waitressing at a public golf course in Kent as she did not have the money to take a run at LPGA Qualifying School. When a regular restaurant customer offered to sponsor her for three years, she and her husband sold their house, furniture and car and moved to the United States where she earned non-exempt status on the LPGA Tour by tying for 52nd at the 1998 Final Qualifying Tournament.

Stupples made her professional debut in Hawaii and, after a season in which her best finish was a tie for 8th, she returned to the LPGA Final Qualifying Tournament, where she tied for 17th to earn exempt status for the 2000 season. Over the 2000 - 2003 period, she achieved 7 top ten finishes, but her form transformed in 2004.

After finishing second behind Annika Sörenstam at the ANZ Ladies Masters in Australia, Stupples carded the best 72-hole raw score in LPGA Tour history (258) to win her maiden title, the Welch's Fry Championship, by five strokes. This win made her eligible to join the Ladies European Tour and begin earning points for the 2005 Solheim Cup. She had not joined the LET when joining the LPGA as she could not at the time afford the joining fee of £600. She followed this up by winning the Women's British Open at Sunningdale where she became only the second player in history to record a double eagle or albatross at an LPGA major championship (began the final round with an eagle, albatross on the first two holes). She became only the third English player to win a major after Laura Davies and Alison Nicholas. and was the first home winner since Penny Grice-Whittaker in 1991. She crossed the $1 million mark in LPGA career earnings at the U.S. Women's Open and finished in sixth place on the money list.

At the end of 2004, Stupples was made an honorary member of Royal Cinque Ports Golf Club in Deal, the Kent golf club which she first joined as a 15-year-old and she attended a reception at Buckingham Palace where she met The Duke of York.

In 2005, Stupples represented England at the 2005 Women's World Cup of Golf in South Africa alongside Laura Davies, was one of Catrin Nilsmark's five wild card picks making her Solheim Cup debut at Crooked Stick GC, in Carmel, Indiana and was part of the International Team at the Lexus Cup.

At the 2014 Women's British Open, Stupples announced her retirement from professional golf.

Broadcasting career
Stupples has been working with the Golf Channel since 2013 and she currently provides regular commentary during LPGA women’s golf broadcasts.

Personal life
Stupples is married to Bobby Inman, who served as her caddie, and she gave birth to a son on 21 April 2007.

Professional wins

LPGA Tour wins

Ladies European Tour wins
2004 Weetabix Women's British Open
2009 S4/C Wales Ladies Championship of Europe

Major championships

Wins (1)

Results timeline
Results not in chronological order before 2014.

^ The Women's British Open replaced the du Maurier Classic as an LPGA major in 2001.
^^ The Evian Championship became an LPGA major in 2013.

CUT = missed the half-way cut.
DQ = disqualified
"T" = tied

LPGA Tour career summary

Team appearances
Amateur
European Ladies' Team Championship (representing England): 1995, 1997
Curtis Cup (representing Great Britain & Ireland): 1996 (winners), 1998
Vagliano Trophy (representing Great Britain & Ireland): 1997

Professional
Lexus Cup (representing International team): 2005 (winners), 2008 (winners)
Solheim Cup (representing Europe): 2005, 2011 (winners)
World Cup (representing England): 2005

Solheim Cup record

1 Kerr conceded the match at its start, because of injury. Following Solheim Cup rules, this is recorded as a 10 and 8 win for Stupples.

References

External links

English female golfers
Arkansas State Red Wolves women's golfers
Florida State Seminoles women's golfers
LPGA Tour golfers
Ladies European Tour golfers
Winners of LPGA major golf championships
Solheim Cup competitors for Europe
Sportspeople from Dover, Kent
1973 births
Living people